Mexichromis antonii is a species of sea slug, a dorid nudibranch, a shell-less marine gastropod mollusk in the family Chromodorididae.

Distribution 
Three paratypes were also included in the original description, from Isla San Jose,, Los Islotes, and Santiago Bay, near Manzanillo, Colima,. It has been reported from the Gulf of California south to Panama.

Description
Mexichromis antonii has a light blue mantle with two bands of colour at the edge, inner black and outer yellow-orange. There is a mid-dorsal line of white which is broken into elongate spots surrounded by a pink-magenta region which stretches from the rhinophore bases to the gill. The light blue area is divided longitudinally by a faint black line. The bases of the rhinophores and gill leaves are pale magenta with the outer half black.

Ecology

References

Chromodorididae
Gastropods described in 1976